Dick Halterman (born April 28, 1947) is a former American collegiate women's basketball coach. He is best known as the head coach of the Oklahoma State Cowgirls basketball program from 1983 to 2001. In 19 seasons as head coach, he posted a 350-244 (.589) record.  After his tenure at Oklahoma State, he served as the head coach for the Cameron Aggies women's basketball program from 2002 to 2006.

Head coaching record

References

1947 births
Living people
Cameron Aggies women's basketball coaches
Oklahoma State Cowgirls basketball coaches
American women's basketball coaches